Edward Holmes (1832 – 1909) was a British architect from Birmingham, England.

Family
He was the son of Edward Holmes and Elisa Henrietta Roulet, christened on 7 September 1832 in St Mary's Church, Moseley.

He married Mary Ann Briggs on 7 October 1856 at St Mary's Church, Moseley. Mary Ann was the daughter of Samuel and Elizabeth Briggs.
There were three children: Elizabeth Henriette Holmes (1857 - 1944), Edward Briggs Holmes (1858 - 1920) and Gertrude Fanny Holmes (1861-1938).

There is a brass plaque in St Mary's Church, Selly Oak to the memory of Mary Ann Holmes aged 31 years, wife of Edward Holmes (Architect of this Church) who died 5 November 1861 and is buried in the Family Vault at St Mary's Church, Moseley.

Holmes married Mary Lavinia Hemming on 27 May 1863  in Alvechurch. They had a further 11 children.

He contracted pneumonia just before Christmas 1909 and died at Wyndcliffe, School Road, Moseley on 30 December 1909 and his funeral was held in Moseley parish church on 3 January 1910. Mary Lavinia died in 1921.

Buildings designed

Lodge and twin mortuary chapels, Belper Cemetery. 1858
All Saints' Church, King's Heath with Frederick Preedy, 1860
St Mary's Church, Selly Oak. 1861
Moseley Independent Congregational chapel. 1862
St James' Church, Shirley. New roof. 1862.
Exchange Building, 1865. Enlarged 1877. Demolished 1965.
Immanuel Church, Broad Street, Birmingham. 1865
Former Masonic Hall, Ethel Street, Birmingham, 1865-69
Midland Bank, New Street, Birmingham. 1867-69 (now Apple retail store)
Former Medical Mission, River Street, Birmingham, 1880
Lady Chapel addition to St Paul's Church, Moseley Road, Balsall Heath. 1865.
Freemasons' Hall, Grand Lodge of Ireland, Molesworth Street, Dublin. 1866.
St John The Divine, Horninglow, Burton upon Trent. 1867
 St Mark's, Winshill, Burton-on-Trent, 1869
Kings Norton Workhouse. 1870
St Paul's Church, Dosthill. 1872
George Wilkinson and Co, Ashted Steam Brewery, Ashted Row, Birmingham. 1874
37 Bennetts Hill, Birmingham. Date unknown.
Chadwick Manor, Balsall, Solihull

References

External links
Irish Architecture site entry on Grand Masonic Hall
Derwent Valley Mills entry on Belper Cemetery
Institutions.org.uk entry on Kings Norton Workhouse
Project Gutenberg entry on Showells' dictionary of Birmingham

19th-century English architects
1832 births
1909 deaths
Architects from Birmingham, West Midlands